Leonard Edmund Henry Williams,  (6 December 1919 – 9 June 2007) was the former chief of the Nationwide building society, also known for his career as a Spitfire pilot in the Royal Air Force during the Second World War.

Early life and RAF career
Williams was born in Acton, London to a labourer and a cook. He won a scholarship to Acton County Grammar, leaving at 16 to train as an accountant at Acton Borough Council. On the outbreak of the Second World War, he joined the Royal Air Force (RAF) and was trained as a mechanic. After a time servicing Westland Wapiti biplanes in India, he was selected for pilot training. Posted to Southern Rhodesia (now Zimbabwe), Leading Aircraftman Williams became involved in the wider British Commonwealth Air Training Plan and joined the Initial Training Wing at Hillside, a suburb of Bulawayo. Basic flying training took place at Induna and advanced flying training at Thornhill.

On 14 August 1943, Williams was commissioned into the Royal Air Force Volunteer Reserve as a pilot officer and sent to the Middle East, where he gained experience of single-seat fighter aircraft. On 25 February 1944, he was posted to No. 225 Squadron RAF, at the time based at Lago airfield, 30 miles north of Naples, and equipped with Supermarine Spitfire Mk.V fighters. Williams flew his first operational sortie spotting for Allied artillery firing on a bridge at Ausonia, Lazio on 8 April 1944.

Promoted to the rank of flying officer, Williams flew with No. 225 Squadron all through 1944 from a number of airstrips in Italy, Corsica and southern France. On 23 October that year he took off from Peretola with Flying Officer Stanley Waldman (brother of TV producer Ronnie Waldman) as wingman, to carry out a tactical reconnaissance to the Bologna-Ferrara-Cento-San Giovanni in Persiceto area. What happened on that mission was later narrated by Williams himself:

Due to injuries sustained during his parachute jump, Williams was later admitted to hospital for some time. In January 1945, he was awarded the Distinguished Flying Cross. The citation reads:

Postwar career
After the war, Williams qualified as an accountant and joined the Gas Council as chief internal auditor, then became finance officer of what was then the Cooperative Permanent Society in 1954. He stayed with the company for the remainder of his career, rising through the ranks to become chief executive in 1967 and chairman in 1982, by which time it had become the Nationwide Building Society.

Williams became the best-known and most widely quoted spokesman for the building societies movement as deputy chairman, then chairman, of the Building Societies Association (BSA) from 1977 to 1981. He had the uncomfortable task of presiding over the BSA's decision to introduce the highest ever mortgage rate – 15 per cent – but at the same time he was an advocate of dismantling the building society interest rate cartel and the recommended mortgage rate system. In 1986, the Nationwide became the first society to take advantage of the opportunities opened up by the 1986 Building Societies Act to broaden out into banking services. The same year the society, by then the third biggest in the league, merged with the seventh largest society, Anglia. Williams served as chairman, then president, of the Nationwide Anglia until 1992. Among other appointments, he served as chairman of BUPA from 1988 to 1990. Under his leadership, Nationwide supported air tattoos and the RAF Benevolent Fund. Moreover, Williams was a life member of the RAF Club, of which he also served as a vice-chairman.

Discovery and excavation of Spitfire crash site
The remains of Williams' Spitfire were recovered in Galciana, Tuscany in late 2002. The aircraft was identified as an LF Mk.IX, s/n MH 768, equipped with a Merlin 66 engine and delivered on 19 September 1943 to 39 Maintenance Unit. On 24 October 1943 it was loaded onto SS Charlton Hall and shipped to Casablanca, where it arrived the following 17 November. On 30 November it was assigned to 218 Group and employed on tactical reconnaissance missions in North Africa. From 28 September 1944 it was allotted to 225 Squadron operating from Peretola airfield. 

On 23 October 1944 it was shot down by Flak and abandoned by the pilot. It received Category E damage and subsequently it was stricken off register. The serial number also proved to be decisive in tracking down the pilot, who was able to return to the town exactly 59 years after the crash. To this day, the wreckage of Spitfire MH 768 is on display in the Gothic Line Museum in Montemurlo.

References

Bibliography
RAF News, 14 November 2003.
Intercom, Spring 2004.

External links
Obituary. The Telegraph. Retrieved 2010-07-31.
Obituary. The Sunday Times. Retrieved 2010-07-31.
 A scale model of Spitfire LF Mk.IX MH 768
 Home page of Gruppo Storico Veicoli in Montemurlo, where the wreckage of Williams' Spitfire is showcased.

1919 births
2007 deaths
Commanders of the Order of the British Empire
Recipients of the Distinguished Flying Cross (United Kingdom)
People educated at Acton County Grammar School
People from Acton, London
Royal Air Force Volunteer Reserve personnel of World War II
Royal Air Force officers
Royal Air Force pilots of World War II
British World War II fighter pilots
Shot-down aviators